The Toledo, St. Louis and Western Railroad, often abbreviated TStL&W and commonly known as the Clover Leaf, was a railroad company that operated in northwestern Ohio, north central Indiana, and south central Illinois during the late 19th and early 20th centuries.

History

The TStL&W originated with the Toledo, Cincinnati and St. Louis Railroad, a company formed in February 1881 as a consolidation of several smaller,  narrow gauge lines connecting the Ohio cities of Toledo and Cincinnati with St. Louis, Missouri.

The following constituent companies formed the Toledo, St. Louis and Kansas City Railroad:
 Toledo, Dupont and Western Railway of Ohio
 Bluffton, Kokomo and Southwestern Railroad of Indiana
 Toledo, Charleston and St. Louis Railroad of Illinois

The Toledo, St. Louis and Kansas City was reorganized in 1900 and renamed as the Toledo, St. Louis and Western Railroad.  It operated 450.72 miles of line between Toledo and East St. Louis.  The Clover Leaf became part of the larger New York, Chicago and St. Louis Railroad (the "Nickel Plate") on December 28, 1922, which eventually became part of Norfolk Southern.

References

Defunct Illinois railroads
Defunct Indiana railroads
Defunct Missouri railroads
Defunct Ohio railroads
Former Class I railroads in the United States
Predecessors of the New York, Chicago and St. Louis Railroad
Railway companies established in 1900
Railway companies disestablished in 1923